The Canton of Clères is a former canton situated in the Seine-Maritime département and in the Haute-Normandie region of northern France. It was disbanded following the French canton reorganisation which came into effect in March 2015. It had a total of 22,992 inhabitants (2012).

Geography 
An area of farmland and forests in the arrondissement of Rouen, centred on the town of Clères. The altitude varies from 42m (Montville) to 186 m (Le Bocasse) with an average altitude of 147m.

The canton comprised 22 communes:

Anceaumeville
Authieux-Ratiéville
Le Bocasse
Bosc-Guérard-Saint-Adrien
Cailly
Claville-Motteville
Clères
Eslettes
Esteville
Fontaine-le-Bourg
Frichemesnil
Grugny
La Houssaye-Béranger
Mont-Cauvaire
Montville
Quincampoix
La Rue-Saint-Pierre
Saint-André-sur-Cailly
Saint-Georges-sur-Fontaine
Saint-Germain-sous-Cailly
Sierville
Yquebeuf

Population

See also 
 Arrondissements of the Seine-Maritime department
 Cantons of the Seine-Maritime department
 Communes of the Seine-Maritime department

References

Cleres
2015 disestablishments in France
States and territories disestablished in 2015